Greenville Liberty SC is an American women's soccer team, that began play in 2022 in USL W League. They are affiliated with Greenville Triumph SC, a men's team in the USL League One.

History
On June 8, 2021, Greenville Triumph SC announced that they would create a women's team that would be one of the eight founding members of the new W League. Fans chose the name Greenville Liberty, which was announced along with the team colors and crest, on March 23, 2022 .

The Liberty won their first game by defeating the Charlotte Independence women's team 4-2 on May 15 in Charlotte. They won their home debut by defeating the North Carolina Courage U23s 6-1 on May 20.

Players and staff

Current roster

Staff

  Megan Kolak – Senior Vice-president
  Julie Carlson – Head Coach & Technical Director
  Sarah Jacobs – Assistant Coach
  Kevin Kennedy – Assistant Coach
  Santiago Restrepo – Goalkeeping Coach
  Blakely Mattern – Performance Coach
  India Trotter – Performance Coach

Record

Year-by-year

Head coaches
 Includes Regular Season and Playoffs. Excludes friendlies.

Honors
  USL W League
 South Atlantic Division Winner: 2022

Player honors

See also 
 Greenville Triumph SC

References

Women's soccer clubs in the United States
Soccer clubs in South Carolina
2021 establishments in South Carolina
Association football clubs established in 2021
USL W League teams